Subang Football League is an amateur football league held in Subang, Selangor, Malaysia. The League is a Malaysian football league at level 4 of the Malaysian football league system and the part of Malaysia M4 League. The league is managed by the Football Association of Selangor (FAS).

History

Starting from 2018, this league will have promotion to the newly established fourth-tier league called Malaysia M4 League. Langkawi Glory United become the first team to get the promoted when , the club has won the Subang M4 League and been eligible to compete in the Malaysia M3 League.

For 2019 season, the champions of Subang Football League will qualify for the M3 League playoff round.

Champions

League 

2018 : Langkawi Glory United
2019 : MPKJ FC

SFL Cup 
2019 : MPKJ FC

References

External links
Official Website

4
Malay